Freddie Steinmark (January 27, 1949 – June 6, 1971) was an American college football player, whose diagnosis of bone cancer and subsequent leg amputation during his junior year with the University of Texas Longhorns provided an inspiration for the team's national championship that year. His life has since been the subject of a number of inspirational books and a movie.

Football career

Steinmark was a member of the 1969 Texas Longhorns football team, which won a national championship.

Two days after his performance on a painful left leg against the 1969 Arkansas Razorbacks football team in the "Game of the Century", played on December 6, 1969 and won by Texas, 15–14, x-rays revealed a bone tumor just above his left knee. A biopsy confirmed the tumor was malignant osteogenic sarcoma, and he was treated at the M.D. Anderson Cancer Center in Houston. On December 12, 1969 his leg was amputated at the hip.

Twenty days later, he stood on the sideline with his team as Texas defeated Notre Dame in the 1970 Cotton Bowl Classic on New Year's Day. Steinmark's fight against cancer inspired the United States Congress to write the National Cancer Act of 1971 and President Richard Nixon to sign it into law, thus beginning the "War on Cancer".

Autobiography

In 1971, with the help of Dallas Times Herald sports editor Blackie Sherrod, Steinmark wrote and published his autobiography I Play to Win. The book was published posthumously, almost 3 months after Steinmark's death. Steinmark is the subject of the 2015 movie My All American, and a coinciding biography Freddie Steinmark: Faith, Family, Football, published by the University of Texas Press (September 1, 2015).
Steinmark died on June 6, 1971 at the University of Texas MD Anderson Cancer Center. He was a Roman Catholic.

Legacy
Steinmark was honored with the Darrell K Royal–Texas Memorial Stadium's scoreboard on September 23, 1972. The current version of the Freddie Steinmark scoreboard, nicknamed Godzillatron, stands forty-seven-feet high.

On November 7, 2015, the University of Texas Longhorns rededicated the scoreboard to Steinmark in a ceremony attended by the Steinmark family and many previous Longhorn players. The Longhorns wore throwback uniforms similar to those worn by the 1969 squad for their game against the Kansas Jayhawks, removing the "Texas" wordmark from the front of the jerseys, the TV numerals from the shoulder pads, and names from the back. The helmets featured the decal for college football's centennial, which was celebrated in 1969.

See also
 List of American football players who died during their career
 Freddie Steinmark: Faith, Family, Football
 My All American

References

External links
 
 Official Freddie Joe Steinmark Website
 First Authorized Biography Press Release
 

1949 births
1971 deaths
American football safeties
Texas Longhorns football players
People from Wheat Ridge, Colorado
Players of American football from Denver
Deaths from cancer in Texas
Deaths from bone cancer
Catholics from Colorado